Oleg Petrovich Vernigorov (born 5 May 1972 in Rostov-on-Don) is a former Russian football player.

External links
 

1972 births
Sportspeople from Rostov-on-Don
Living people
Soviet footballers
FC Rostov players
Russian footballers
Russian Premier League players
FC SKA Rostov-on-Don players
FC Tyumen players
Association football midfielders